Constance Anne Louise Trotti, marchioness Arconati-Visconti (21 July 1800 – 18 May 1871), was a Belgian noble who hosted a leading cultural salon in Brussels. She became known as a patron of artists and Belgian cultural life.

She was born in Vienna to a functionary at the Austrian court and married her cousin Giuseppe Trotti in 1818. In 1821, the couple moved to Brussels, where she became a leading socialite. She hosted a salon which became the center of the Belgian aristocracy and the French exiled colony, and acted as a patron of Belgian cultural life.

References 

1800 births
1871 deaths
19th-century Belgian people
Belgian nobility
Belgian salon-holders